Édouard Ferlet is a pianist of the French jazz scene.

Early years
Ferlet began playing piano at the age of 7 and studied classical music at l’École Normale de Musique de Paris, and later on at the Conservatoire regional. In the late eighties, he moved to Boston, US, and studied piano under renowned teachers: Herb Pomeroy, Hal Crook, Ed Tomassi, Ray Santisi, Ed Bedner. In 1992, he graduated from the Berklee College of Music in Jazz Composition and was awarded the Berklee jazz performance award.

Career
Back in France, he worked as a composer for a variety of TV programs and gained a sound experience in the field thanks to the diversity of the commissions he had to face. 
He rapidly recorded two albums under his name: Escale and Zazimut featuring key artists of the new European jazz generation: Médéric Collignon, Christophe Monniot, Simon Spang-Hanssen, Claus Stotter, François Verly, Gary Brunton.

In 2000, he met the bassist Jean-Philippe Viret with whom he recorded three albums in 6 years (Considérations, Étant Donnés and L’Indicible), as well as a DVD and a CD distributed exclusively in Japan. In a few years, this trio, under the label Sketch, was nominated for the Django d'or, les Victoires de la Musique (French Grammy Awards) and obtained great critiques in the media.
At the same time, he continued to play with singers from various backgrounds: Mark Murphy in Jazz, Manda Djin in Gospel, Geoffrey Oryema in World Music and Lambert Wilson in cabaret. 
He successfully conducted the musical direction for Julia Migenes' show Alter Ego. This allowed him to tour all over the world: China, Canada, Germany, Spain, France. He received praise for his sensitivity and his artistic commitment during musical interludes.

Melisse
In 2006 Édouard Ferlet and Benjamin Gratton founded Melisse, a French contemporary jazz label. The label supports Ferlet's and other innovative jazzmen's works who share the same musical vision, and has produced albums by Issam Krimi, the Jean-Philippe Viret Trio, François Raulin /Stéphan Oliva, as well as Édouard Ferlet himself.

Discography
Réflections (1996), with Marc Buronfosse
Escale (1997)
Zazimut (1999)
Considérations (2000), with Jean-Philippe Viret and Antoine Banville
French Cricket (2002), with Brunt'Off (Gary Brunton's band)
Étant Donnés (2002), with Jean-Philippe Viret and Antoine Banville
Par Tous Les Temps (2004)
L'Écharpe d'Iris (2007)
Think Bach (2012)
Think Bach Op.2 (2017)

Notes

External links 
 Ferlet's official website
 Ferlet's LastFM page
 Home Melisse. Retrieved 8 March 2009

French jazz pianists
French male pianists
French jazz composers
Male jazz composers
20th-century French musicians
École Normale de Musique de Paris alumni
1972 births
Living people
Chevaliers of the Ordre des Arts et des Lettres
21st-century pianists
20th-century French male musicians
21st-century French male musicians